Mateo Castellano (born 12 March 1996) is an Argentine footballer who plays for Atlético de Rafaela as a midfielder.

References

External links

1996 births
Living people
Association football midfielders
Argentine footballers
Club Sportivo Ben Hur players
Atlético de Rafaela footballers
Club Sportivo Estudiantes players
Unión de Sunchales footballers
Central Norte players
Argentine Primera División players
Primera Nacional players
Torneo Federal A players
People from Rafaela
Sportspeople from Santa Fe Province